The thirteenth season of Family Guy aired on Fox in the United States from September 28, 2014, to May 17, 2015.

The series follows the dysfunctional Griffin family, consisting of father Peter, mother Lois, daughter Meg, son Chris, baby Stewie and the family dog Brian, who reside in their hometown of Quahog.

The season begins with a 44 minute-long crossover with The Simpsons entitled "The Simpsons Guy". Guest stars throughout the season include Julie Bowen, Liam Neeson, Maya Rudolph, Chris Hardwick, Emily Osment, T.J. Miller, Lea Thompson, Allison Janney, Connie Britton, and Tony Sirico.

Also during this season, Joe writes a children's book ("The Book of Joe"), Peter and Lois open a cookie store ("Baking Bad"), Stewie becomes pregnant with Brian's baby ("Stewie Is Enceinte"), Meg becomes a foot fetish model ("This Little Piggy"), and Brian and Stewie take Chris back through time to help him with his history class, with the three ending in chaos on the Titanic ("Stewie, Chris, & Brian's Excellent Adventure"), There is also a Christmas episode with the return of Jesus, who claims that he has never had sex ("The 2000-Year-Old Virgin"), and Peter attempts to beat up guest star Liam Neeson ("Fighting Irish").


Promotion
At San Diego Comic Con 2014, Fox released a trailer for the upcoming 44 minute crossover episode with The Simpsons, titled The Simpsons Guy.

Episodes

References

Family Guy seasons
2014 American television seasons
2015 American television seasons